Jack O'Shea (born 19 November 1957 in Cahersiveen, County Kerry) is an Irish former sportsperson. He played Gaelic football at various times with his local clubs St Mary's in Kerry and Leixlip in Kildare. He was a member of the Kerry senior football team from 1976 until 1992. O'Shea is regarded as one of the greatest players of all-time.

He is currently a media pundit with a column in the sports section of the Irish edition of The Sunday Times. His son Aidan made his debut for the Kerry senior team in their successful 2009 National Football League campaign.

Playing career

Minor & under-21
By the early 1970s, O'Shea had come to prominence on the Kerry minor football team. He made his minor championship debut against Waterford in 1974, however, the year ended without any success for Kerry. In 1975, a 3–7 to 1–11 defeat of arch-rivals Cork gave O'Shea a Munster winners' medal in the minor grade. That same year he was a late inclusion on Kerry's under-21 football team. O'Shea missed Kerry's Munster under-21 final triumph; however, he later lined out in the All-Ireland final in that grade with Dublin providing the opposition. A 1–15 to 0–10 score line gave Kerry the victory and gave O'Shea an All-Ireland winners' medal.

In 1976, O'Shea won his first Munster under-21 title as Kerry retained their provincial crown at the expense of Cork. He later lined out in a second All-Ireland final. Kildare provided the opposition on that occasion; however, they were no match for Kerry. O'Shea collected a second All-Ireland winners' medal following a 0–14 to 1–3 victory.

Kerry and O'Shea made it three Munster under-21 titles in-a-row in 1977 following a two-goal defeat of Cork. O'Shea's side later qualified for the All-Ireland final with Down providing the opposition. A 1–11 to 1–5 score line gave Kerry the victory and gave O'Shea a third under-21 All-Ireland winners' medal.

In 1978, O'Shea made it an impressive four Munster under-21 titles in-a-row as Kerry retained their provincial crown at the expense of Cork. He later lined out in a fourth consecutive All-Ireland final. Roscommon provided the opposition on that occasion; however, a close game developed. At the final whistle Kerry were defeated by 1–9 to 1–8.

Senior
O'Shea made his senior inter-county debut with Kerry in late 1976 versus Meath in Navan. In fact, 1976–77 proved to be a successful National Football League campaign with O'Shea capturing a first National Football League winners' medal. He subsequently captured a first Munster title at senior level following a win over Cork. Kerry later took on Dublin for the third consecutive year; however, this time it was in the All-Ireland semi-final. In one of the greatest games of football ever-played 'The Dubs' triumphed and O'Shea was still left waiting for a senior All-Ireland final appearance.

In 1978, Kerry faced little competition in the provincial championship once again. A defeat of Cork gave O'Shea a second consecutive Munster title. Kerry later qualified for a third All-Ireland final in four years. Old rivals Dublin provided the opposition, however, the game turned into a rout. The game is chiefly remembered for Mikey Sheehy's sensational goal. The Kerry forward lobbed the ball over the head of Paddy Cullen, who was caught off his line arguing with the referee. Eoin Liston announced his arrival on the inter-county scene and scored a hat-trick of goals. Pat Spillane played all over the field, including goalkeeper after Charlie Nelligan was sent off. At the full-time whistle, Kerry were the winners by a 5–11 to 0–9 scoreline.

In 1979, Kerry made it five-in-a-row in Munster as Cork fell by ten points in the provincial final. It was O'Shea's third Munster title.  He later went in search of a second consecutive All-Ireland medal. Dublin provided the opposition for the fifth consecutive occasion.  Kerry were handicapped throughout the game. Ger Power did not start the game, while John O'Keeffe got injured and Páidí Ó Sé was sent off during the encounter. Two goals by Mikey Sheehy and a third by John Egan helped 'The Kingdom' to a 3–13 to 1–8 victory. It was O'Shea's second All-Ireland winners' medal.

Kerry's dominance continued in 1980. Another defeat of Cork in the provincial final gave O'Shea a fourth Munster winners' medal in succession. Another All-Ireland final appearance beckoned, this time with Roscommon providing the opposition. The Connacht champions shocked Kerry and took a five-point lead inside the first twelve minutes. Mikey Sheehy popped up again to score the decisive goal, as Kerry went on to claim a 1–9 to 1–6 victory in a game that contained sixty-four frees. The victory gave Kerry and O'Shea a third All-Ireland title in succession. He finished off the impressive year by collecting the Texaco Footballer of the Year award.

In 1981, O'Shea won his fifth consecutive Munster title, before lining out in the All-Ireland final against Offaly. Kerry had an easy win with seven players combining for a great goal. He captured his fourth All-Ireland winners' medal that day as Kerry won by 1–12 to 0–8. O'Shea also retained the Footballer of the Year title.

In 1982, O'Shea won his second National League medal before Kerry secured an eighth consecutive Munster final victory over Cork, giving him a sixth provincial winners' medal. The All-Ireland final pitted 'the Kingdom' against Offaly for the second consecutive year. Kerry had the upper hand for much of the game and were leading by two points with two minutes left to be played. The game, however, was not over—as Offaly substitute Séamus Darby, who had entered the game almost unnoticed, produced the most spectacular of finishes by scoring a late goal. Kerry failed to score again to level the match and Offaly went on to win their third All-Ireland title ever. Kerry's five-in-a-row dream was shattered.

Kerry missed out on a historic nine-in-a-row in Munster in 1983, as Cork finally triumphed. 'The Kingdom' bounced back the following year with O'Shea winning his third National League medal and his seventh Munster title. The centenary-year All-Ireland final pitted Kerry against old rivals and reigning champions Dublin. 'The Kingdom' dominated the game from start to finish. Only two of Dublin's forwards scored as Kerry ran out easy winners by 0–14 to 1–6. It was O'Shea fifth All-Ireland winners' medal. A third Footballer of the Year award quickly followed. Also in this centenary year O'Shea was selected in one of the midfield positions in the GAA's Football Team of the Century.

Kerry made no mistake again in 1985. A two-goal victory over Cork gave O'Shea an eighth Munster winners' medal. Another All-Ireland final beckoned, with Dublin providing the opposition for a second consecutive year. O'Shea scored a key goal after eleven minutes and Kerry stormed to a nine-point lead at half-time. 'The Dubs' came storming back with Joe McNally scoring two goals. The gap could not be bridged and Kerry won by 2–12 to 2–8. The victory gave O'Shea a sixth All-Ireland winners' medal. He was also presented with the Footballer of the Year award for a record fourth occasion, while also collecting a record sixth All Star in the midfield position.

In 1986, Kerry's dominance showed no sign of disappearing. Cork fell again in the provincial final, giving O'Shea a ninth Munster title.  An eighth All-Ireland final appearance quickly followed and it turned out to be a historic occasion. Tyrone provided the opposition in their first-ever Championship decider. A Peter Quinn goal gave the Ulster men a six-point lead in the second-half; however, the game was far from over. Pat Spillane ran fifty yards up the field for a hand-passed goal to get Kerry back on track. Mikey Sheehy scored a second goal to give 'the Kingdom' a 2–15 to 1–10 victory. It was O'Shea's seventh All-Ireland medal.

The glory days were now over for Kerry as Cork captured the next four Munster titles. O'Shea continued to play with Kerry, winning his eleventh Munster title as captain of the team in 1991. Kerry were subsequently defeated by eventual champions Down in the All-Ireland semi-final. O'Shea retired from inter-county football the following year when Clare defeated 'The Kingdom' to win their second ever Munster Senior Football final.

Inter-provincial
O'Shea also lined out with Munster in the inter-provincial football competition and enjoyed much success. He first lined out with his province in 1977 as Munster defeated Connacht in the final by 1–14 to 1–9. It was his first Railway Cup winners' medal and the first of two-in-a-row for Munster. After losing out in 1979 and 1980 O'Shea captured a third Railway Cup title in 1981. A one-point defeat of Connacht gave O'Shea a fourth Railway Cup winners' medal in 1982. He lined out for Munster on a number of occasions between then and 1991; however, he never tasted Railway Cup success again.

Internationals
O'Shea represented Ireland in 9 International Rules Tests against Australia. He played 3 Tests in each of the 1984 and 1986 series, and culminated in being awarded the Harry Beitzel Medal as the outstanding player of the 1990 series.

Management
In 1992 Jack O'Shea was appointed manager of the Mayo senior football team. His two-year period produced one Connacht title. However, his time as manager was not considered a success as Mayo did not reach an All-Ireland Final. In his first year, he won the Connacht title by beating Roscommon by 1–5 (8) to 0–7 (7). But Cork hammered Mayo 5–15 (30) to 0–10 (10) in the semi-final. In his second campaign as manager, Leitrim, led by former Mayo manager John O'Mahony, beat Mayo 0–12 (12) to 2–4 (10) in the Connacht Final. A poor Mayo performance produced just one point in the second half. Following that final, O'Shea resigned as manager, stating that he had enjoyed management but was not planning to try it again. He has not managed since.

Honours
Kerry
Munster Minor Football Championship : 1 (1975)
Munster Under-21 Football Championship : 3 (1976, 1977, 1978)
All-Ireland Under-21 Football Championship : 3 (1975, 1976, 1977)
Runner-Up : 1 (1978)
Munster Senior Football Championship : 10 (1977, 1978, 1979, 1980, 1981, 1982, 1984, 1985, 1986, 1991; capt.)
Runner-Up : 5 (1983, 1987, 1988, 1989, 1990)
All-Ireland Senior Football Championship : 7 (1978, 1979, 1980, 1981, 1984, 1985, 1986)
Runner-Up : 1 (1982)
National Football League : 3 (1976-77, 1981-82, 1983-84)
Runner-Up : 2 (1979-80, 1986-87)

Munster
Railway Cup : 4 (1977, 1978, 1981, 1982)

Individual
Texaco Footballer of the Year : 4 (1980, 1981, 1984, 1985)
All Stars Awards : 6 (1980, 1981, 1982, 1983, 1984, 1985)
 In May 2020, a public poll conducted by RTÉ.ie named O'Shea at midfield alongside Brian Fenton in a team of footballers who had won All Stars during the era of The Sunday Game.
 Also in May 2020, the Irish Independent named O'Shea at number one in its "Top 20 footballers in Ireland over the past 50 years".

References

1957 births
Living people
All Stars Awards winners (football)
Gaelic football managers
Irish columnists
Kerry inter-county Gaelic footballers
Munster inter-provincial Gaelic footballers
Leixlip Gaelic footballers
People from Cahersiveen
St Mary's (Kerry) Gaelic footballers
Singing talent show winners
Texaco Footballers of the Year
Winners of seven All-Ireland medals (Gaelic football)
You're a Star contestants